Intermittent Spring, also called Periodic Spring, is located in Swift Creek canyon in Star Valley, near Afton, Wyoming. It is the largest rhythmic spring in the world.

The great great grandfather of Rulon Gardner is credited with the discovery. Gardner says, "He was up there logging. He went up and found a nice little place to get some fresh water. It was intermittent. It went, and stopped. So it was pretty amazing".

Siphon theory 
The theory is that as groundwater flows continuously into a cavern, it fills a narrow tube that leads out. As it pours over the high point of the tube, it creates a siphon effect, sucking water out of the chamber. Eventually air rushes in and breaks the siphon. Kip Solomon, a hydrologist at the University of Utah, said, "We can't think of another explanation at the moment".

When the University of Utah conducted and finished their studies, Solomon concluded that "The spring water's gas content has now been tested at the University of Utah. The data strongly suggests the water was exposed to air underground; strong support for the siphon theory."

See also
Gihon Spring, another well known rhythmic spring, located in the ancient City of David
Salt River Range

Sources 

 
 

Springs of Wyoming
Bodies of water of Lincoln County, Wyoming